"You're Good for Me" is a song recorded and performed by American Dance musician Tony Moran, featuring vocals from American singer Kimberly Davis. The collaboration marks Moran's eighth and Davis' second number one (as the two collaborated with Nile Rodgers on 2017's "My Fire"), on Billboard's Dance Club Songs chart, reaching the summit in its April 7, 2018 issue.

Track listings
Digital download
You're Good for Me (feat. Kimberly Davis) [Radio Edit] 4:02   
You're Good for Me (feat. Kimberly Davis) [Video Mix] 4:35   
You're Good for Me (feat. Kimberly Davis) [Tony M Urban Soul Rider Remix] 4:02

Charts

Weekly charts

Year-end charts

References

External links
Official Video at YouTube

2018 songs
2018 singles
Electronic songs
House music songs
Songs written by Tony Moran